DD Haryana, is a state-owned TV channel, and only government-owned television production center in Haryana, telecasting from the Hisar Doordarshan Kendra in sector-13 of Hisar of Haryana state in India. DD Haryana TV Channel is now available on DD FreeDish Channel Number 98.

History
Hisar Doordershan Kendra and TV Studio with Satellite Earth Station and DD-2 transmitter, was officially inaugurated on 1 Nov 2002 in Hisar (city) by the Bharatiya Janata Party leader Sushma Swaraj who was then Union Minister of Information and Broadcasting, though programs were not telecast daily and it began only with the production of 75 minute long news program in Hindi language. It was upgraded to a regional channel as DD Haryana, by the new Bharatiya Janata Party government under prime minister Narendra Modi, with daily telecast from 1 Nov 2015 covering the whole of Haryana with 19 relay centers.  It telecasts from 04.30 pm to 07-00 pm Monday to Friday and from 06.45 pm to 07.00 pm from Saturday & Sunday.

List of programmes
DD Hisar telecasts the following Television programs:
 Ghar Aangan: for women, every Monday from 5.00 PM to 5.30 pm
 Navtarang: career counseling for youth, every Tuesday at 5.00 pm
 Kisan: for farmers, from Monday to Friday 5 days a week from 05:30 pm to 06:00 pm		
 Nanhi Duniya: infotainment for children, every 3rd, 4th & 5th Thursday at 5.00 pm

Technology
It is the only state-owned  Television studio in Haryana, equipped with  Satellite earth station and transmission tower.

See also
 BIG FM 92.7
 DD Direct Plus
 Radio Mantra
 List of programs broadcast by DD National
 List of South Asian television channels by country
 Ministry of Information and Broadcasting

External links
 Doordarshan Official Internet site
 Video of the Kisan program of Haryana Doordarshan 
 Doordarshan news site
 An article at PFC

References

Doordarshan
Television stations in India
Television channels and stations established in 2002
Mass media companies established in 2015
Indian direct broadcast satellite services
Mass media in Haryana
Hisar district
Hisar (city)